Colonel Saw Chit Thu is a  Karen military officer and former insurgent commander who is the current general secretary and executive advisor of the Central Command of Border Guard Forces (BGF). Saw Chit Thu is a former commander of DKBA Battalion 999, and majority of BGF troops operating in Karen State are from the Democratic Karen Buddhist Army (DKBA) faction that broke away from the Karen National Union (KNU) and allied itself with the Burma Army in 1994. Among the DKBA leaders, he is believed to the most powerful decision-maker in both the DKBA's military wing and its political administration. He also owns large businesses dealing with logging and auto trading, and he is rumored to be involved in drug trafficking. In 2010, he accepted the Burmese government’s demands to transform the DKBA into a Border Guard Force, under the command of the Tatmadaw. 

In 2017, Saw Chit Thu began working with Yatai International Holding Group, led by Chinese convict, She Zhijiang, to develop Yatai New City in Shwe Kokko, after She gave Chit Thu a down payment of US$300,000. He also linked a deal with the Dongmei Group, led by Chinese triad leader, Wan Kuok-koi, to develop Saixigang. In June 2020, the civilian-led government launched a tribunal to investigate the Yatai development, successfully halting ongoing construction. The probe embarrassed the Myanmar Armed Forces, which oversees Saw Chit Thu's BGF. In December 2020, the Tatmadaw pressured Saw Chit Thu and other high-ranking officers including Major Saw Mout Thon and Major Saw Tin Win, to resign from the BGF. Major Saw Mout Thon of BGF Battalion 1022 resigned on 8 January, along with 13 commanders, 77 officers and 13 battalions of 4 regiments who collectively signed and submitted their resignations. Under pressure amid controversy, at least 7,000 BGF members resigned to protest the ouster of their top leaders. However, Saw refused to retire.

In the aftermath of the 2021 Myanmar coup d'état, the Myanmar Armed Forces have became pre-occupied with the ensuing Myanmar civil war (2021–present), which has enabled the Yatai New City to resume development. In November 2022, he was awarded the title of Thiri Pyanchi, one of the country’s highest honors.

References

Burmese people of Karen descent
Burmese military personnel
Burmese rebels
Year of birth missing (living people)
Living people